Palmetto Cheese is a trademark for a brand of pimento cheese from Pawleys Island Specialty Foods, a division of Get Carried Away, based in Pawleys Island, South Carolina. It is manufactured and packaged at Duke Sandwich Productions located in Easley, South Carolina. It is sold in three varieties: Original, Jalapeño, and Bacon.

History
The Palmetto Cheese recipe was developed by Sassy Henry for tailgating at Atlanta Braves games. In 2006, the cheese was officially marketed to the area with 20 packages put for sale at Independent Seafood in Georgetown, South Carolina.

To meet growing demand for the product, Palmetto Cheese contracted manufacturing to a producer in Simpsonville, South Carolina. In 2011, distribution nearly doubled with the addition of Giant-Carlisle, Giant-Landover, Stop & Shop, and Albertsons locations. In April, 2012, Palmetto Cheese became available at 699 Walmart stores, leading contract manufacturer Duke Sandwich to develop a new 80,000-square-foot facility to deal with increased production.

In 2013, customers consumed 4.1 million containers of Palmetto Cheese, with the original variety being the company's top seller, followed by jalapeño and bacon varieties.

In 2020, Palmetto Cheese faced a boycott after owner Brian Henry, while serving as mayor of Pawleys Island, South Carolina, referred to Black Lives Matter as a "terror organization". Henry said a boycott would harm workers and later apologized for the post.

See also
Pimento cheese
 Pub cheese

References

External links
 Palmetto Cheese website
 Palmetto Cheese Blog

American cheeses
Brand name dairy products
Cuisine of the Southern United States
Spreads (food)